Llandanwg is a village in the Ardudwy area of Gwynedd, in Llanfair community Wales. It is situated on the coast, has a railway station, and a medieval church in the sand dunes behind the beach which is a Grade II listed building.

The village
The village of Llandanwg is situated to the west of the A496 coastal road between Llanbedr and Harlech, close to the village of Llanfair and about two miles south of Harlech. Originally it was a small collection of farms to the north of the river Artro, close to where it enters the sea. Later developments expanded the size of the village. The village has a railway station, Llandanwg Halt, where trains on the Cambrian Line stop on request. However a new evening train service was introduced in 2015 which angered local residents when it was found that it would not stop at Llandanwg and certain other halts.

There is an easily accessible, shelving beach at the end of the road through the village. It is part of the Snowdonia National Park. Nearby is Mochras or "Shell Island", accessible by a causeway but only at low-tide.  The Llandanwg Holiday Home Park provides static holiday homes on a hillside above the village with extensive views over Tremadog Bay.

The Church of Saint Tanwg
The church is medieval, probably dating from the 13th century, however there are three fifth to sixth century inscribed stones and two stones with inscribed crosses inside the building which indicates much earlier activity, and it has probably been a place of worship since the Age of the Saints, possibly as early as the first part of the 5th century. Much of the churchyard is buried in sand. The church is a Grade II Listed building.
The churchyard contains the war graves of a Royal Welsh Fusiliers soldier and Royal Garrison Artillery officer of World War I.

Llandanwg Gallery

References

External links 

National Rail - Llandanwg Halt
Good Beach Guide - Llandanwg
www.geograph.co.uk : photos of Llandanwg and surrounding area

Villages in Gwynedd
Villages in Snowdonia
Seaside resorts in Wales
Llanfair, Gwynedd